Stephanie "Steph" Rhodes-Bosch (born 17 July 1988) is a Canadian eventing rider. She was a part of the Canadian team that won a silver medal in eventing at the 2010 World Equestrian Games. At the same event, she placed 9th individually riding Port Authority, a horse with whom she previously won an individual bronze at the 2008 North American Young Riders Championships.

References

External links
 

1988 births
Living people
Canadian female equestrians
Event riders
Sportspeople from Edmonton